The Men's double FITA round integrated was an archery competition at the 1984 Summer Paralympics.

The Swedish archer, Jan Thulin won the gold medal.

Results

References

1984 Summer Paralympics events